Haugan Mountain is a summit in Mineral County, Montana at .

References

External links
 

Mountains of Mineral County, Montana
Mountains of Montana